The 2005 CHL All-Star Game (for sponsorship reasons officially named the 2005 Dodge CHL All-Star Game) was played on January 12, 2005 in Laredo, Texas. The format featured the Northern Conference All-Stars vs. the Southern Conference All-Stars, with each Central Hockey League team having a minimum of one representative to appear on the All-Star roster.

The starting line-ups were selected through balloting among the CHL coaches, broadcasting and/or public relations staff, and designated media members in each CHL market. The remaining players were chosen by the All-Star coaches in concurrence with the CHL's hockey operations department.

Starting line-ups

Northern Conference 
Chris Stewart, Colorado Eagles (Coach)
Chad Woollard, Fort Worth Brahmas (Forward)
Greg Pankewicz, Colorado Eagles (Forward) 
Don Parsons, Memphis Riverkings (Forward)
Paul Esdale, Wichita Thunder (Defence)
Derek Landmesser, Memphis Riverkings (Defence) 
Tyler Weiman, Colorado Eagles (Goal)

Southern Conference
Chris Dashney, Lubbock Cotton Kings (Coach)
Derek Hahn, Amarillo Gorillas (Forward) 
Jason Baird, Corpus Christi Rayz (Forward) 
Brent Cullaton, Lubbock Cotton Kings (Forward) 
Bernie John, Corpus Christi Rayz (Defence)
Derick Martin, Lubbock Cotton Kings (Defence)
Scott Reid, San Angelo Saints (Goal)

References
Dodge CHL All-Star Game Starting Lineups Announced - OurSports Central

All-Star Game
Central Hockey League All-Star Games